August Heißmeyer or Heissmeyer, (11 January 1897 – 16 January 1979), was a German SS functionary during the Nazi era. He commanded the SS Main Office in 1935–1939. After World War II, Heissmeyer was tried and convicted as a "major Nazi offender".

Early life
After finishing school, Heissmeyer joined the Prussian military. In World War I, in August 1914 he volunteered for the Prussian army. Participant of the First World War, from October 1914 he served in the 164th Infantry Regiment, lieutenant (August 6, 1916), company commander. From August 1917 until the end of the war he was a pilot. He was awarded the Iron Cross 1st and 2nd Class for his distinguished service. After the end of the war, Heissmeier was a member of the Freikorps and in 1920 participated in the Kapp Putsch. After giving up his studies, he was employed as a driving teacher. In 1923 he first came into contact with the Nazi Party, which he joined in 1925. In early 1926, Heissmeyer joined the Sturmabteilung (SA) where he was responsible for building up the SA-Gausturm Hannover-Süd and was for a time, from 1927 to April 1928, the acting Deputy Gauleiter. In 1940 Heissmeyer, previously married with six children in his custody, married Gertrud Scholtz-Klink, the Reichsfrauenführerin (Reich Women's Leader), who had two previous marriages herself.

SS career
Heissmeyer joined the Schutzstaffel (SS) in January 1930. From 1932, Heissmeyer was posted to the SS Main Office, becoming its leader in 1935 and relieving Heinrich Himmler from that specific position. On 9 November 1936, Heissmeyer was promoted to SS-Obergruppenführer (general) and Inspector of the National Political Institutes of Education. In 1939, Heissmeyer was appointed SS Oberabschnittsleiter "East" and in 1940 as HSSPF (Higher SS and Police Leader) Spree, where he was in charge of the Berlin-Brandenburg area. 

August Heissmeyer took over the command of the SS Totenkopf Standarte in 1940 from the outgoing Theodor Eicke, who in 1939 had begun commanding a combat SS division (SS Division Totenkopf) and therefore gave his supervision over the concentration camps back to the SS Leadership Main  Office. Heissmeyer was provisionally in charge of this bureau until May 1942. Richard Glücks took over the position, and became the chief of the Concentration Camps Inspectorate. In April 1945, Heissmeyer was given command of Kampfgruppe "Heissmeyer", a collection of Volkssturm militia and Hitler Youth who were given the task of protecting the Spandau airfield outside Berlin.

Post-war trial and conviction
At the end of World War II in Europe, Scholtz-Klink and Heissmeyer fled from the Battle of Berlin. After the fall of Nazi Germany, in the summer of 1945, she was briefly detained in a Soviet prisoner of war camp near Magdeburg, but escaped shortly afterwards. With the assistance of Princess Pauline of Württemberg, she and her third husband went into hiding in Bebenhausen near Tübingen. They spent the subsequent three years under the aliases of Heinrich and Maria Stuckebrock. On 29 February 1948, the couple were identified and arrested by French authorities near Tübingen and held for trial the following month. He served 18 months in prison before being released in 1949. The following year, he was sentenced by the denazification appeals court to three years of imprisonment and the forfeiture of property as a "major Nazi offender". His nephew Kurt Heissmeyer, an SS physician, was also convicted.

After his release, Heissmeyer went to live in Schwäbisch Hall and became the director of the West German Coca-Cola bottling plant. He died on 16 January 1979, five days after his 82nd birthday.

References

External links
 
 

1897 births
1979 deaths
Coca-Cola people
German Army personnel of World War I
Holocaust perpetrators
Kapp Putsch participants
Nazi Party officials
Nazis convicted of war crimes
People from Hameln-Pyrmont
People from the Province of Hanover
Prussian Army personnel
Recipients of the Iron Cross (1914), 1st class
SS and Police Leaders
SS-Obergruppenführer
Sturmabteilung officers
20th-century Freikorps personnel
Volkssturm personnel
Waffen-SS personnel